Tommy Praefke Kristiansen (born 8 October 1953) is a Danish former footballer who played as a midfielder. He played in two matches for the Denmark national team from 1977 to 1979.

References

External links
 
 

1953 births
Living people
Sportspeople from Frederiksberg
Danish men's footballers
Association football midfielders
Denmark international footballers
Denmark youth international footballers
Denmark under-21 international footballers
Eredivisie players
Vanløse IF players
Go Ahead Eagles players
Feyenoord players
Edmonton Drillers (1979–1982) players
HFC Haarlem players
Brønshøj Boldklub players
SC Heerenveen players
Danish expatriate men's footballers
Danish expatriate sportspeople in the Netherlands
Expatriate footballers in the Netherlands
Danish expatriate sportspeople in Canada
Expatriate soccer players in Canada